Luis de las Casas y Aragorri (Sopuerta, Spain, 25 August 1745 – Puerto de Santa María, 19 July 1800) was Spanish Governor of Cuba and the Commander in Chief of the Province of Louisiana and the Floridas.

Links 
Auñamendi Eusko Entziklopedia

References

Governors of Cuba
Governors of Louisiana
Spanish colonial governors and administrators
1745 births
1800 deaths
18th-century Cuban people